Konstantin "Costa" Ronin (born 3 February 1979) is an Australian actor and cinematographer, best known for appearances in Red Dog, as Gregorovich on the SBS drama East West 101, as Oleg Igorevich Burov in the FX drama The Americans and as Yevgeny Gromov on Homeland.

Early life and education
Costa Ronin was born in Kaliningrad, Russian SFSR, Soviet Union (now Russia). He spent the first 17 years of his life in Russia. In his youth, he moved to Wellington, New Zealand with his mother and studied international relations and political science at Victoria University, before moving to Perth, Australia for further tertiary education and, later, to Sydney.

At the age of 15, Ronin commenced working and learned about American culture at a radio station that taught English through music.

Personal life
Growing up in Kaliningrad, Ronin was taught to sail by his father and grandfather at the age of 5 and remains passionate about it. 

Ronin is married to Leah Ronin as of June 2021. 

Ronin and his wife reside in New York, having previously lived in Los Angeles, Surry Hills, Sydney.

Ronin's grandmother lives in Australia.

Filmography

References

External links
 
 
 .mp3 interview with Ronin

1979 births
Living people
People from Kaliningrad
Russian expatriates in New Zealand
Victoria University of Wellington alumni
Australian expatriates in the United States
Australian people of Russian descent
Australian male television actors
Australian male film actors
Russian emigrants to Australia
21st-century Australian male actors
Russian expatriates in the United States